Kevin William Barden (3 June 1908 – 4 December 2004) was the Roman Catholic Archbishop of Ispahan from 1974 to 1982. He had previously served as parish priest of the Dominican church in Tehran.

Early life and ordination
He was born in Dublin in 1908 and was one of five children. His father, Thomas Garret Barden, worked for the Irish Independent. He was educated at Synge Street CBS. He entered the Dominican Order in Tallaght in 1924 and took the religious name William. He studied philosophy in Tallaght and theology in Rome. He was ordained on 28 February 1931.

Priest and bishop
After ordination he earned a doctorate at the University of Firbourg. He taught theology in the Dominican house of studies St. Mary's Priory,in Tallaght and gave public lectures for thirty years until he went to establish a Dominican presence in Tehran in 1961. A church and parish were established in Iran at the request of the Vatican. Barden was joined by Father Hugh Brennan and they rented a house near Tehran University which they named Rosary House. The numbers of people attending Mass increased to the extent that Barden organized the construction of a purpose-built parish church which became known as St Abraham's.

In 1970 he was appointed Apostolic Administrator of Isfahan. He was consecrated as Archbishop of Isfahan of the Latins on 25 October 1974. He remained in Iran until the Islamic Revolution; he was expelled in 1980. He returned to Ireland and with no prospect of returning to Iran he submitted his resignation to Pope John Paul II in 1982. In 1991 he moved to the Sacred Heart nursing home in Raheny, where he died in 2004.

References 

1908 births
Irish expatriate Catholic bishops
People educated at Synge Street CBS
Christian clergy from Dublin (city)
21st-century Roman Catholic bishops in Iran
2004 deaths